Pulaski County Courthouse is a Classical Revival building in Hawkinsville, Georgia dating from 1874. The building is located on the southwest corner of Commerce Street (US BUS 129/341/SRs 11 BUS/26) and North Lumpkin Street. It was listed on the National Register of Historic Places in 1980.

The core of the building was built in 1874.  In 1885, the courthouse's clock was added.  In 1897 and 1910, it had major additions.  It is unusual among courthouses for having a chapel, just outside the entrance to the courtroom, which is used for weddings and prayer groups.

The courthouse is a contributing building in the Hawkinsville Commercial and Industrial Historic District.

References

External links
 
Pulaski County Magistrate, Probate and Superior Courts

Courthouses on the National Register of Historic Places in Georgia (U.S. state)
Neoclassical architecture in Georgia (U.S. state)
Government buildings completed in 1874
Buildings and structures in Pulaski County, Georgia
County courthouses in Georgia (U.S. state)
National Register of Historic Places in Pulaski County, Georgia